Dombemada is a village in Rambukkana Divisional Secretariat in Kegalle district, Sabaragamuwa province, Sri Lanka.

There is a sub post office of Sri Lanka national postal service  in the village. The postal code of Dombemada is 71115.

Dombemada Kanishta Vidyalaya
is the only government school of that village which belongs to Rambukkana division of Mawanella education zone.

References

Populated places in Kegalle District
Populated places in Sabaragamuwa Province